Plank Bridge Creek is a tributary of Spring Brook in Lackawanna County, Pennsylvania, in the United States. It is inhabited by wild trout throughout its length. The surficial geology in its vicinity mainly consists of Wisconsinan Till, bedrock, Boulder Colluvium, alluvium, and wetlands.

Course
Plank Bridge Creek begins on a mountain in Spring Brook Township. It flows northwest for several hundred feet before turning northeast. After a few tenths of a mile, it turns north for a few tenths of a mile before turning east-northeast and entering a valley between Pinnacle Hill and another hill. The creek then turns north-northeast for several tenths of a mile before turning west-northwest and flowing alongside Spring Brook to its confluence with Spring Brook.

Geography and geology

The surficial geology in the vicinity of Plank Bridge Creek mainly consists of bedrock and a glacial or resedimented till known as Wisconsinan Till. The bedrock contains conglomerate, sandstone, and shale. However, small patches of alluvium, Boulder Colluvium (which contains numerous quartz, sandstone, and shale boulders), and wetlands are also present.

A hill known as Pinnacle Hill is in the watershed of Plank Bridge Creek.

Watershed
The entirety of the watershed is situated in Spring Brook Township. The watershed is in the Lower North Branch Susquehanna basin. The creek is entirely within the United States Geological Survey quadrangle of Avoca.

History
Plank Bridge Creek was entered into the Geographic Names Information System on August 2, 1979. Its identifier in the Geographic Names Information System is 1183996.

In the early 2000s, the Lackawanna River Watershed Conservation Plan recommended that Spring Brook Township include protection of Plank Bridge Creek in their comprehensive plans, as well as their ordinances for land use, zoning, and subdivision.

Biology
Wild trout naturally reproduce in Plank Bridge Creek from its headwaters downstream to its mouth.

See also
Rattlesnake Creek (Spring Brook), next tributary of Spring Brook going downstream
Panther Creek (Spring Brook), next tributary of Spring Brook going upstream
List of rivers of Pennsylvania
List of tributaries of the Lackawanna River

References

Rivers of Lackawanna County, Pennsylvania
Tributaries of Spring Brook (Lackawanna River)
Rivers of Pennsylvania